The , abbreviated as D1GP and subtitled Professional Drift, is a production car drifting series from Japan. After several years of hosting amateur drifting contests, Daijiro Inada, founder of Option magazine and Tokyo Auto Salon, and drifting legend, Keiichi Tsuchiya hosted a professional level drifting contest in 1999 and 2000 to feed on the ever increasing skills of drifting drivers who were dominating drifting contests in various parts of Japan. In October 2000, they reformed the contest as a five-round series. In the following year for the following round, the introduction of the two car tsuiou battle, run in a single-elimination tournament format, a common tradition for tōge races which became popular with car enthusiasts.

Since then, the series has spread from the United States to United Kingdom and Malaysia to New Zealand with an ever increasing fanbase all over the world. The series has become a benchmark for all drifting series as its tsuisou format became widely adopted in drifting events throughout the world and is the most highly regarded of all series. The series helped to turn not just its personnel but also many of its drivers into celebrities with appearances in TV shows and car magazines all over the world along with scale models and video game appearances for their cars. It was credited for the increase several-fold in tuning businesses specialising in drift set-ups.

History

The art of drifting can be traced to the early days of motorsport when pre-war Grand Prix and dirt track racing drivers such as Tazio Nuvolari used an at-the-limit form of driving called the four-wheel drift.

The bias ply racing tires of the 1960s-1980s lent themselves to driving styles with a high slip angle. As professional racers in Japan drove this way, so did the street racers.

As street tōge racing became increasingly common, one of the first drifting contests was hosted by the Japanese Carboy magazine in 1986 and then in 1989, the year after the first introduction of the Video Option series Daijiro Inada (稲田大二郎) decided on introducing a rival drifting event which was judged by Keiichi Tsuchiya known as the Ikaten. Through the years, the standards of drifting drivers has risen rapidly and drivers began to dominate the series. As a result, Inada decided on a new series to accommodate the more experienced and skilled drivers. In 2000, a new series called All Japan Professional Drift Championship (全日本プロドリフト選手権, Zen Nihon Puro Dorifuto Sensyuken) consisting of Keiichi Tsuchiya (土屋圭市) and Manabu Orido (織戸 学) as judges, and Manabu Suzuki (鈴木 学) as commentator. Other personnel consisted of Kitahara, as the tech inspector, and Takayasu Ozaku (more commonly known as Zaku the perverted cameraman) as the series' long serving cameraman. Racing driver Tarzan Yamada made appearances in earlier rounds and Inada himself would usually make guest appearances in the opening ceremony and judging stand.

The first ever event was at Ebisu Circuit in Fukushima, Japan, in October 2000 with an entry of forty and a crowd of three thousand. Drivers were judged individually and were treated as the first round of the  season, shortly renamed as D1 Grand Prix. From round two onward, the series took a different turn. Unlike drift events which judged the cars individually each round then eliminating the rest, the series introduced the one-to-one round battle called the tsuiso (twin run) round which has been the tradition for Tōge races and has since been adopted for drifting events all over the world. Aftermarket parts manufacturers BLITZ, HKS and A'PEXi soon began to get involved by sponsoring drivers entering the competition.

In , the number of cars competing in the tsuiou rounds was reduced from ten to eight, and was reduced to 6 by round two, as the second tansou rounds increased to twelve. That was increased to sixteen by round four which stands to this day.

The series remained domestic until 2003 when an exhibition round was hosted at Toyota Speedway at Irwindale, California, USA and produced by American marketing company, Slipstream Global. That same year, Grassroots Motorsports also presented the D1 Grand Prix with the Editors' Choice Award. Slipstream Global would later create the Formula Drift Championship in 2004. With a sellout crowd of ten thousand, which broke the record for the venue and the series, this venue became the series' opening round in 2004. The US round saw the introduction of the English speaking commentator Toshi Hayama, who also dealt with the organisation of the non-Japanese events.

That year also saw the car accessories store Autobacs as the title sponsor, and brought the first non-circuit event at Odaiba in Japan in January , held in a Fuji Television car park. It also later ran as a championship round. In December 2004, the D1GP was held in the California Speedway in Fontana, California, as a non-championship US vs. Japan event, running alongside the JGTC race as part of the non-championship GT Live event. Manabu Orido resigned as a judge at the end of the season to become a driver.

The other regular staff for the  season were D1 girls Kazumi Kondo (近藤和美) and Hatsuno Sugaya (菅谷はつ乃) who previously had careers as JGTC race queens. For the 2006 season, Hatsuno was replaced by Jyuri Tamashiro (玉城珠里).

As the series has always been Japanese dominated with few non-Japanese making it to the best 16, in the first round of the  season, after narrowly beating Masato Kawabata who spun during their tsuiso round battle, Rhys Millen became the first non-Japanese driver to advance to the best 8 round. He lost to Yasuyuki Kazama after a sudden death tsuiso battle. That year saw the introduction of the D1 Street Legal category which was unveiled at the Odaiba round, for cars which are built to be driven on the road.

The series' only guest commentator was the TV presenter, singer, Super GT driver and amateur drifter Hiromi Kozono (ヒロミ; real kanji name 小園 浩巳) who guest commentated at the 2005 Odaiba Allstar event.

In October 2005, the D1GP ventured to Europe with an exhibition round at Silverstone, Northamptonshire, UK. This event provided an upset, as after putting on a good performance in the first run, the Irishman Darren McNamara advanced to the best 8 round after overtaking the series regular Hiroshi Fukuda on the first run. Like Rhys Millen in the first round, McNamara fell victim to Kazama after losing four to six then tying in the other round. With a crowd attendance of five thousand, in the following year the D1GP ran its own national series in the UK.

At the non-championship D1 USA vs Japan Allstar Exhibition at Irwindale Speedway in December 2005, the series had its first non-Japanese winner for both car and driver: Vaughn Gittin with his Ford Mustang GT. At the following season opener in March , Samuel Hübinette with his Dodge Viper SRT/10 took things further by making it into the best 8 by beating Gittin in a sudden death tsuiso battle, Hubinette made it to the semi-final when he defeated Takahiro Ueno, only to be beaten by Nobushige Kumakubo in his Subaru Impreza GDB. Kumakubo went on into the finals to be beaten by Yasuyuki Kazama, who won his third successive first round championship event.

In 2006, the D1GP ventured into the highly lucrative Asian market by hosting a feeder series in Malaysia, as well as in New Zealand, both of which are currently only running a drivers' search event, which gives the drivers who do well in any of the national series a chance to compete at the final non-championship event held in Irwindale in addition to the final round which only the three UK series drivers was invited by Tsuchiya, who was impressed by their skills during the UK exhibition event. McNamara, the only of the three drivers to qualify in the points-scoring final round and to enter with his own car, finished in the last 8 in both events, only to lose  to Nomura in both through a sudden death match. As that was the only year to have a franchise in the UK, McNamara would compete in the US series.

In , the former D1GP driver, Hisashi Kamimoto retired from driving to join as judge. The D1 Gals of 2006 was replaced by the "D1 Sisters" who were audition winners and representative of the agency D-Sign, consisting of Hiromi Goto, Yuria Tachiki, Asami Kikuchi and Ayaka Tashiro.

Since the series began, Video Option has always covered all of the official D1GP events. Its English language sister title JDM Option, which was established in 2004, also covers the events. In 2007, the sports channel, J Sports ESPN began screening highlights of the series with Suzuki and Nomura as presenters, with the D1 Sisters making guest appearances.

For the 2009 season, the US arm underwent a new management team to kickstart a new domestic series Tsuchiya, who was also on the executive board, stepped down when the organization went under new management.

In December 2010, Keiichi Tsuchiya and Daijiro Inada both decided to resign from D1GP due to consistent irresponsible management.

The following year saw the first time D1GP will continue without Tsuchiya nor Inada Hisashi Kamimoto who was part of the judge is promoted to chief judge and assisted by Akira Iida, Shinichi Yamaji, Eiji Yamada and Ryusuke Kawasaki, the Tanso Champions is awarded for the driver with the best Solo run driver and Tanso Winner is awarded for the best qualifier for each round. In the same year Youichi Imamura winning his 4th and last title making him driver with the most D1GP title.

2014 saw the ban on the nitrous oxide system which force the car to be fitted with a larger turbo or larger displacement engine.

Since 2018 D1GP has streamed all of its round and its feeder series D1 Lights from YouTube for free with Japanese and English language stream on their official channel D1GP MOVIE CHANNEL.

In 2022 D1 Grand Prix started the "Next 10 Years" Project in order to develop an appeal for D1 for the upcoming 10 years by creating a competition that could be enjoyed even more and make an environment which makes it easier for the teams and drivers to compete in the competition and at the same time creating new standards for safety and fairness and competition.

Road to D1

Usually, drivers in Japan have to make it to the top of the championship table in one of four major national drifting series':
Advan Drift Meeting
A'PEX Cup
ORC Drift Championship
BN Sports D1 Drift Championship
Outside Japan, drivers have to enter a Driver Search. Once they have qualified, they receive a D1 License, which enables them to enter the qualifying rounds and the newly introduced national series, plus the exhibition events that they are invited to.

In a championship event, usually entries are restricted to one hundred cars. Each car gets an allocation of three individual tansou (solo run) qualifying runs: only the best one counts. At the end of the day, the top twenty qualifiers join the ten seeded cars who are determined by the top ten on the D1GP championship tables. The seeded drivers are usually a red background on their number to identify them.

On race day, after two sets of practice runs are done through, competitors will go through a starting ceremony which they will be introduced to the crowds and then a driver will be rounded up in group of fours and be given a set of three qualifying runs to make it into the best 16 tsuiso (twin run) round battles, which involves two cars drifting simultaneously. The Tansou groups would be given, Priority A, B and C. "A" indicates seeded drivers and "C" indicates as qualifiers. The Tansou rounds always starts with the series leader and then goes through to the last driver with the highest number, which usually indicates that he is a qualifier. At the end of the drivers three rounds, only the best run counts and on each run, they are judged with an assistance of a DriftBox, which determines angle, keeping to the correct racing line and speed. That will be given a score up to a maximum of 100.0, should a driver score that point, he will be given a bonus score of 1 point which will be added to his score they accumulates during the tsuiou round.

At the end when all drivers are judged, the judges picks the sixteen drivers for the tsuiou round, the highest scoring driver will be paired up against the sixteenth highest scorer, the second highest will be paired against the fifteenth highest and so on. Between this and the following tsuiou round, there is a pit walk session at the paddock area for spectators, usually off-limits to them, where they can get close to the D1 personnel, drivers and cars. This usually lasts up to an hour which the crowds disembark back to the crowd area ready for the tsuiou round.

During a tsuiso round battle, one car follows another through the course, attempting to keep up with or even pass the car in front. It does not matter if the drifting line is wrong: it matters who has the most exciting drift. Normally, the leading car usually produces a maximum angle drift, but still closes off the inside line to prevent passing. The chasing car usually drifts with less angle, but very close to the lead car. However, the chasing car does not even have to keep up. In fact, in some cases, if a car that was left behind on the straight manages produces a beautiful drift, it could win that round. A spin, under-steer, or collision, results in a disqualification and a zero score for the offending party in that battle.

At the final round, the two finalists will be gathered in front of the judging stand, which they park up together and stand by their car to be formally addressed by the judges, the driver would return to the starting line to continue with their last sets of tsuiou rounds. Until 2004, there was a third place playoff for the losing semi finalists, which has been dropped. Should there be no sudden death rounds being called up, the finalists would return in front of the judging area with the losing drivers, who would return from the starting line; where the winner's name will be called up be the lead judge, which a large trophy and bottle of champagne will be presented to them by the D1 Gals. A cheque would usually be presented to the top 3 drivers, the winner's cheque is usually worth ¥1million or $5000 in US events. After the name is announced, in some event, the driver would be given a toss-up by competitors, a common tradition in some sports and usually the spectators will be invited onto the track.

As a D1 Licence has a lifespan of twelve months, a driver must qualify into the best 16 spot for an automatic renewal for the next year. Failing to do so, they must re-enter the Driver Search.

Typical D1GP vehicle regulations
Considering the fact that the D1GP is a series geared towards production cars only, there are a number of different race regulations that the vehicle must undergo in order to be eligible to compete. They are:

Only rear wheel drive is permitted. The vehicle must be a standard production, road-going model from a major vehicle manufacturer. It may also be converted from front-wheel drive, or all wheel drive.
Vehicles constructed by a vehicle manufacturer solely for the purpose of racing are prohibited.
The vehicle must retain the original chassis/body—only stock body constructed from a vehicle manufacturer is allowed.
 No tube frame vehicles or tube frame chassis extensions are permissible unless part of the OEM structure
 Space frame chassis are not permitted, additional triangulation and bracing of suspension turret/mounting points is allowed so long as the car vehicle contains its original monocoque chassis.
 Vehicles must retain their original VIN in its OEM position as well as the OEM chassis plate where applicable -- VIN must not be altered, clearly visible and readable.
 Convertible vehicles must have a hard top installed and a roll cage which will be effective in the event of a vehicle rolling onto its roof. The hard top must be securely fastened to the body.
 The vehicles appearance must be similar to that of the original vehicle.
Semi-Slick Tires/DOT-R Compounds (S-Tires) were prohibited after the first season as they are not road legal, after Nobuteru Taniguchi used them to win the championship in 2001. The series now only permits commercially available road tires approved by the organization.
Catalytic converters must be installed to keep the vehicle to the maximum noise limit at race circuits.
In the past, Drivers’ Search rules were more lenient to that of the championship rules until 2005, which the same rules apply to this day.

D1 Street Legal

As the D1GP category was moving away from its grassroots during the earlier days, and budgets and development costs were getting higher, the organisers introduced the D1 Street Legal  (D1ストリートリーガル (D1 sutoriito riigaru in katakana), as D1SL) category at the Odaiba round in 2005 for road driven cars which were different from the main category as they are trailer driven between races.

Being a budget series, this meant that there is tighter restrictions on how a car can be modified. For example, the car must have a working car stereo system and must have the original engine which it was originally supplied with. Also there is no wide body extension and wings must be within the width of the car. The car must also retain many of its original features, especially dashboard, doors, etc. which sometimes can be replaced/removed/modified in the D1GP category. In all the car has to prove its road-worthiness by its entrant providing a shaken certificate.

Initially, the new series was treated to two exhibition rounds in 2005, and was given a full seven round the following year. Although the series is geared towards novice drifters, it also attracts D1GP star drivers including the Suenaga brothers, Masao and Naoto, many of its former D1GP regulars, and fan-favourites like Ken Nomura.

In 2006, the organisers started a divisional series called D1SL Divisional Series which does not require a D1 License and is broken up in four regions: north, south, east, and west, with rounds that consist of 3 to 4 events in each region and a point scoring system that is the same as the other series'. The winner of the series at the end is awarded a D1 License.

In 2017, the organisers announced the end of the D1 Street Legal series, being replaced by the D1 Lights series from 2018 onwards.

Typical D1 Street Legal vehicle regulations
Although the items that are prohibited in D1GP also applies in D1SL, additional prohibited items in D1SL cars include:
 Sequential transmission.
 Fuel cells.
 Carbon/beamless/FRP door replacements, must be OEM doors with side impact bars intact if possible.
 Airjacks.
 Tubbed fenders/one-off metal body components, must be one that is available to the public.
 Custom/standalone relay/fuse switchboxes.
 Acrylic glass/polycarbonate window inserts and replacements, must be OEM glass.
 complete dash replacement parts, must be stock.

Other restrictions in the category are that:

 Spoilers must stay within the width of the vehicle.
 Brakes must be stock dimensions; no swaps from other models of same make are allowed.
 Vehicles must retain OEM parts (ac/navigation/heater)
 A functioning car audio system must be in place.
A 6-point roll cage with 4-point harness must be in place (same as that of D1GP).
 Restriction of engine swaps from other model into other model, as S15 Silvia Spec-S to Spec-R specification (SR20DE→SR20DET) may be permitted but a RB26DETT into an HR32 Skyline GTS-t is not unless the model is a BNR32, nor even is converting an AE85 to AE86 is permitted. Engines from other manufacturer's car (e.g. Darren McNamara's 13B-REW powered AE86) are not permitted as well. A bolt on turbocharger or supercharger is permitted, the engine in the car can be determined by the VIN plate

D1 Lights 
D1 Street Legal is replaced by D1 Lights started from 2018, unlike D1 Street Legal the car now must be a competition only car and no longer street registered. The safety of the series is also increased due to a spotter being killed due to the wheel from car coming loose ahead of the spotter area during a practice session in the final round of 2016 D1 Street Legal. This led to the round being cancelled completely and the D1 Street Legal was not continued in 2017

The series kicked off with a pre-season event at Nikko Circuit with the series started the first round in Maze Circuit with Daisuke Saito became the first winner of D1 Lights, the first series champion is Junya Ishikawa who graduated to D1GP the following year while Naoki Nakamura who won twice regained his D1GP license and also graduated to D1GP.

In 2019 for the first time D1GP and D1 Lights were held in same venue at same weekend at Autopolis with both series held its series finale. this feat was held again the following year twice with the season opener and once again in Ebisu West.

Like its parent series every round is live streamed on D1's official YouTube channel

D1 National Series

During the 2005 exhibition event at Silverstone, a domestic series was announced with a plan to run the UK round as part of the world series for the following year, though plans for a point scoring round at that location never materialised. The series took over where the Autoglym Drift Championship left off, which was formerly run by the OPT Drift Club, an offshoot of a tuning business called Option Motorsport. The club held a championship in 2002 called D1UK (the previous moniker), though not related to the magazine, for the 2004 season, the business was forced to drop the Option and D1 name for legal reasons.

The difference between the Autoglym series, which was sponsored by the car care product manufacturer, and the D1GB is that the former had a separate championship for beginners called Clubmans which was run in a tansou (solo run) format only and did not require the common safety amenities (e.g. rollcages), and the latter is a main championship for experienced drivers which consists of the usual tsuiso (twin run) rounds. The other difference is, D1 regulation is more stringent on car modifications. The club was since absorbed into the D1 franchise as a national series.

The GB series, was followed by a Malaysia series (D1MY), though the series and drivers' search began earlier than its UK counterpart due to the difference in climate with its first round in March, compared with the UK series in May. The MY series tends to have the privilege of having Tsuchiya to judge the rounds, whereas the UK series only had Dorikin and Manabu Suzuki as judges in Round 2, on the weekend of the D1GP exhibition event. The New Zealand series are currently run as a drivers' search rounds, which awards a D1 License to the winners and allow the top four to compete in the world exhibition event in the US in December.

At the end of the season, the series went through a major technical hitch as the D1 organisation refused to foot the fee to import the top 5 cars to Irwindale as promised, therefore the organizers of the D1GB dissolved its association with the D1 organisation and formed the European Drift Championship (EDC) which uses the same rule as the series itself. As a compromise, the D1 organisation instead gave the top three drivers a chance to compete in US based cars for both  the point scoring and World All-Star round. The D1 franchise would itself move to the US after three seasons of being opening points scoring round.

Drifting team list
Team Orange D1 world drifting champions is led by Nobushige Kumakubo and directed by Hiroki Furuse aka "Sleepy" - Team Orange's Manager. He is also EDC Judge for European Drift Championship. He was consultant for the Codemasters video game, Race Driver: Grid and also with Team Orange. They played as stunt drivers in the feature film The Fast and the Furious: Tokyo Drift, produced by Universal. In 2011, they did a Tuning Film Documentary written and directed by Diego Vida and produced by FanVision.

Championship winners

By Year

By Driver

Tanso (solo run) champions

(Non Championship) All Star winners

Statistics
 Youngest Driver to compete — Ken Gushi, age 16, 2004 Round 1.
 Youngest Driver to enter Best 4 — Emmanuelle Amandio, age 20yrs 10mths, 2013 Round 4
 Youngest Driver to win — Youichi Imamura, age 24yrs 5mths, 2000 Round 1.
 Youngest Championship Winner — Youichi Imamura, age 27yrs 5mths, 2003 Season.
 Oldest Driver to enter Best 16 (Non-Championship) — Rod Millen, age 55, 2005 D1 USA vs Japan Allstar Exhibition.
 Oldest Driver to compete (D1SL) — Daijiro Inada, age 59, 2006 Round 2.
 Oldest Driver to win (D1GP) — Katsuhiro Ueo, age 48yrs 5mths, 2020 Round 5.
 Oldest Driver to win (D1SL) — Kazuyoshi Okamura, age 47, 2006 Round 5.
 Oldest Championship Winner — Hideyuki Fujino, age 43yrs 3mths, 2017 Season.
 Most Wins in a single Season — 5 wins, Daigo Saito, 2015 Season; Masanori Kohashi, 2020 Season.
 Most Tanso/ Solo run in a single Season — 6 wins, Masato Kawabata, 2018 Season.
 Most Points in a single Season — 206pts, Naoki Nakamura, 2021 Season.
 Most Championship Wins — 4 wins, Youichi Imamura  (2003, 2009–2011)
 Narrowest title margin — 1pt; Yasuyuki Kazama (97pts) over Masao Suenaga (96pts), 2005 Season and Nobushige Kumakubo (110 pts) over Ken Nomura (109 pts), 2006 Season; Masato Kawabata (100pts) over Nobushige Kumakubo (99pts), 2007 Season.
 Widest title margin — 45pts; Masanori Kohashi (174pts) over Masashi Yokoi (129pts), 2020 Season.
 Highest number of entries – 124 (Rd 6, 2005).
 Lowest number of entries – 25 (Rd 5, 2001).

All-Time winners list
excludes non-championship, D1SL & non-Japanese National events

Driver

Drivers all-time winning table (Tsuiso)

Tanso all-time winning table (Awarded since 2011 season)

Bold : Active Drivers

Car all-time winning table
(Tsuiso = dual run; tanso = solo run)

Gallery

D1 Grand Prix USA drivers
Alphabetical order
  Kelvin Arreola
  Marc Bergeon
  David Blunt
  James Bondurant
  Mike Burns
  Caper Canul
  Tyler Cox
  Chelsea DeNofa
  Joe Dycus
  Michael Essa
  Ron Freitas
  Chase Goodman
  Andrew Hately
  Joe Haven
  Harri Hokkanen
  Benson Hsu
  Yoichi Imamura
  Daijaro Inada
  Jason Jiovani
  Ed Johnson
  Jeff Jones
  Chris Kregorian
  Nobushige Kumakubo
  Janne Leinonen
  Aaron Losey
  Quoc Ly
  Cyrus Martinez
  Omeed Moinee
  Patrick Mordaunt
  Ken Nomura
  Cody Parkhouse
  Ross Petty
  Juha Rintanen
  Tom Roberts
  James Robinson
  Austin Robison
  Bryan Rogers
  Daigo Saito
  Cody Sarem
  Tony Schulz
  Ben Schwartz
  Bill Sherman
  Joshua Steel
  Kazuhiro Tanaka
  Harri Tervola
  Takahiro Ueno
  Russell Walker
  "Mad" Mike Whiddett
  Forrest Wang
 Will Parsons

References

 
All articles to be expanded
Awards established in 1999
1999 establishments in Japan